A legacy carrier, in the United States, is an airline that had established interstate routes before the beginning of the route liberalization permitted by the Airline Deregulation Act of 1978 and so was directly affected by that Act. Legacy carriers are distinct from low-cost carriers, which, in the United States, are generally new airlines and were started to compete in the newly deregulated industry.

Background
A typical characteristic of legacy carriers is that they usually provide higher quality services than a low-cost carrier; for example, a legacy carrier typically offers first class and business class seating, a frequent-flyer program, and exclusive airport lounges. Many legacy carriers are also members of an airline alliance through which they agree to provide those services to each other's passengers. Also, legacy carriers generally have better cabin services, such as meal service and in-flight entertainment.

The term 'legacy carrier' has generally not been used outside the United States. Many other countries have long-established flag carriers that are or were historically owned by or often given preferential treatment by their national governments. The national airlines occupy a position roughly equivalent to the American legacy carriers on quality of service and membership in international alliances compared to newer low-cost carriers. None of the American legacy carriers is an official flag carrier of the United States.

Since the Deregulation Act, many legacy carriers have folded or merged with other carriers. Those that survived now benefit from the fact that low-cost carriers no longer hold large cost advantages over the major legacy carriers.

A trend among legacy carriers is to outsource short-haul and medium-haul flights to regional airlines. In 2011, 61% of all advertised flights by American, United, and Delta were operated by a regional airline, an increase from 40% in 2000. Another trend is for legacy carriers to aggressively challenge the low cost carriers resulting in some LCCs failing.

Active legacy carriers
The list has shrunk over the years. In 2005 there were four legacy airlines which were under Chapter 11 bankruptcy. More mergers took place in the decade 2010-2019 and more low cost carriers emerged. As of 2020, the list of legacy carriers remaining after 10 years of mergers is as follows:
 Alaska Airlines
 American Airlines
 Delta Air Lines
 Hawaiian Airlines

 United Airlines

Defunct legacy carriers

Through the mid-20th century, the "Big Four" domestic airlines were American, Eastern, TWA, and United. Additionally, Pan Am focused exclusively on international service and was the unofficial U.S. flag carrier. Many smaller airlines operated concurrently, and some grew into national airlines in the years surrounding the 1979 deregulation.

By the end of 1991, there were seven remaining transcontinental legacy carriers: American, Continental, Delta, Northwest, TWA, United, and USAir. These seven stood for a decade until TWA was incorporated into American in 2001; the remaining six subsequently stood for nearly another decade until three of them were respectively incorporated into the other three during the early 2010s.
 Northeast Airlines, merged with Delta in 1972
 Southern Airways, merged with North Central to become Republic in 1979.
 North Central Airlines, merged with Southern to become Republic in 1979.
 National Airlines, acquired by Pan Am in 1980.
 Hughes Airwest, acquired by Republic in 1980.
 Braniff International Airways, defunct in 1982.
 Texas International Airlines, merged with Continental in 1982.
 Frontier Airlines, acquired by PEOPLExpress in 1985, then merged with Continental in 1986.
 Ozark Air Lines, acquired by TWA in 1986.
 Republic Airlines, merged with Northwest in 1986.
 Western Airlines, merged with Delta in 1987.
 Piedmont Airlines, merged with USAir in 1989.
 Eastern Air Lines, defunct in 1991.
 Pan American World Airways (Pan Am), defunct in 1991.
 Trans World Airlines (TWA), merged with American in 2001.
 Northwest Airlines, merged with Delta in 2008; brand retired in 2010.
 Continental Airlines, merged with United in 2010; brand retired in 2012.
 US Airways, merged with American in 2013; brand retired in 2015.

See also
 List of airline mergers and acquisitions
 Low-cost carrier
 List of defunct airlines of the United States

References

Business models
Civil aviation in the United States
Airline types